Nuño Duarte Silva Marta (born 28 November 1976) is a Portuguese former road cyclist. He competed in the men's individual road race at the 1996 Summer Olympics.

Major results
2001
 1st  Road race, National Road Championships
2003
 1st  Overall GP CTT Correios de Portugal
1st Stage 1
2007
 1st  Overall Vuelta a Extremadura
1st Stage 3

References

External links
 

1976 births
Living people
Portuguese male cyclists
Olympic cyclists of Portugal
Cyclists at the 1996 Summer Olympics
People from Torres Vedras
Sportspeople from Lisbon District